Feminine, or femininity, normally refers to qualities positively associated with women. 

Feminine may also refer to:  
Feminine (grammar), a grammatical gender
Feminine cadence, a final chord falling in a metrically weak position
Feminine rhyme, a rhyme that matches two or more syllables at the end of lines with the final syllable unstressed
Feminine Endings, a musicological feminist work published in 1991

See also
Male (disambiguation)
Female (disambiguation)
Masculine (disambiguation)

pt:Feminino